Fimbrin also known as is plastin 1 is a protein that in humans is encoded by the PLS1 gene. Fimbrin is an actin cross-linking protein important in the formation of filopodia.

Structure 

Fimbrin belongs to the calponin homology (CH) domain superfamily of actin cross-linking proteins. Like other members of this superfamily, which include α-actinin, β-spectrin, dystrophin, ABP-120 and filamin, it has a conserved 27 kDa actin-binding domain that contains a tandem duplication of a sequence that is homologous to calponin. In addition to cross-linking actin filaments into bundles and networks, CH domains also bind intermediate filaments and some signal transduction proteins to the actin cytoskeleton. Structural comparison of actin filaments and fimbrin CH domain-decorated actin filaments has revealed changes in the actin structure due to fimbrin-mediated cross-linking that may affect the actin filaments' affinity for other actin-binding proteins and may be part of the regulation of the cytoskeleton itself.

In humans, three highly homologous, strictly tissue and locale specific isoforms have been identified: I-, T- and L-fimbrin. L-fimbrin is found in only normal or transformed leukocytes where it becomes phosphorylated in response to other factors such as interleukin-1. I-fimbrin is expressed by intestine and kidney epithelial cells. T-fimbrin is found in epithelial and mesenchymal cells derived from solid tissue where it does not become phosphorylated. Differences in expression, sequence and phosphorylation among the various fimbrin isoforms suggest the likelihood of functional differences.

Function 

Fimbrin is present in several distinct structures in different cell types, including intestinal microvilli, hair cell stereocilia and fibroblast filopodia. It is usually associated with polarized actin filaments in membrane ruffles, filopodia, stereocilia and adhesion plaques. Sequence homology and biochemical properties show that fimbrin is highly conserved from yeast to humans. Yeast mutants lacking fimbrin are defective in morphogenesis and endocytosis.

Owing to the close proximity of its tandem actin-binding domains, fimbrin directs the formation of tightly bundled actin filaments that participate in dynamic processes, including cytokinesis in yeast and host cell invasion by enteropathic bacteria. Although fimbrin's involvement in processes like these as well as its role in assembly and regulation of microfilament networks are well documented, there are fewer experimental data describing the overall domain organization of the molecule. Klein et al. (2004) detailed the crystal structure of the Arabidopsis thaliana and Schizosaccharomyces pombe fimbrin cores in an attempt to highlight the compact and distinctly asymmetric organization of the fimbrin molecule. This structural study of the fimbrin core represents the first detailed structural description of a functional actin cross-linking protein.

References

Further reading 

 
 

Cytoskeleton
EF-hand-containing proteins